Incheon Station is a railway station on Line 1 and Suin-Bundang Line of the Seoul Metropolitan Subway systems in Bokseong Dong, Jung Gu, Incheon, South Korea. Travel time from Incheon Station to Seoul Station on Line 1 is 68 minutes, and travelling to Suwon Station in Gyeonggi-do, on the other branch of Line 1 takes 91 minutes, transferring at Guro. Incheon is Station 161 (Line 1) and K272 (Suin-Bundang Line).

History
Incheon Station opened on May 20, 1908. Services on the Seoul Subway Line 1 began on August 15, 1974, while on the rebuilt Suin Line on February 27, 2016.

Vicinity
Exit 1: Chinatown, Freedom Park (자유공원), Incheon Harbor, Wolmido, Jajangmyeon Museum (짜장면박물관)

Expansion
Incheon Station has also now become a junction of three lines with the Wolmi Sea Train since 2019.

Gallery

References

Jung District, Incheon
Seoul Metropolitan Subway stations
Metro stations in Incheon
Railway stations opened in 1908
1908 establishments in Korea